Sarılar is a village in Mezitli district  of Mersin Province, Turkey. (Capital of Mezitli district is in Greater Mersin. ) Situated at   it is in the southern slopes of Toros Mountains. The population of Sarılar was  461  as of 2012.

References

Villages in Mezitli District